"Lump in My Throat" is a song from The Departure's debut album, Dirty Words. It was released as the lead single from that album on 4 April 2005, and reached #30 in the UK Singles Chart.

Track listing
7" R6659
"Lump in My Throat"  – 3:20
"The City Blurs Your Eyes"
CD CDR6659
"Lump in My Throat"  – 3:20
"Under the Stairs"
Maxi-CD CDRS6659
"Lump in My Throat"  – 3:20
"Lump in My Throat" (James Ford remix)
"Be My Enemy" (Lamacq Live session)
"Lump in My Throat" (video)

External links
Video link

2005 singles
The Departure songs
2004 songs
Parlophone singles